Modena is an unincorporated community in far western Iron County, near the Nevada border in southwestern Utah, United States.

Geography
The settlement lies along State Route 56 west of the city of Parowan, the county seat of Iron County.  Its elevation is 5,476 feet (1,669 m).

Modena has a post office with the ZIP code of 84753.

The Righteous Branch of the Church of Jesus Christ of Latter-day Saints, a polygamous sect, is based near Modena.

History
The settlement was established as a railroad town in 1899 by the Utah and Nevada Railway. By 1905 it was on the Los Angeles and Salt Lake Railroad route between Salt Lake City and Southern California.

Climate
According to the Köppen Climate Classification system, Modena has a cold semi-arid climate, abbreviated "BSk" on climate maps.

Population

See also

 Nevada State Route 319

References

External links

Unincorporated communities in Iron County, Utah
Los Angeles and Salt Lake Railroad
Populated places established in 1899
1899 establishments in Utah
Unincorporated communities in Utah